KVEX-LP is a Classic Alternative Rock formatted low-power broadcast radio station licensed to Saint Cloud, Minnesota, serving Saint Cloud and Sauk Rapids in Minnesota.  KVEX-LP is owned and operated by St. Cloud State University.

References

External links
 RadioX Online
 

2015 establishments in Minnesota
Alternative rock radio stations in the United States
Radio stations established in 2015
Radio stations in Minnesota
Low-power FM radio stations in Minnesota
College radio stations in Minnesota
St. Cloud State University
Radio stations in St. Cloud, Minnesota